The Myreton Motor Museum is a museum located near the village of Aberlady, East Lothian, Scotland, which has a motoring history collection which covers most of the twentieth century.

Collection 
The museum holds a collection of commercial vehicles, cars, motor cycles, bicycles, motoring memorabilia, and toy cars dating back to the turn of the twentieth century.  A notable exhibit in the museum is the 1989 Jaguar XJS which the British Member of Parliament Sir Menzies Campbell donated  in 2006 to fulfill a commitment on environmental grounds that he had made during his successful campaign to be elected as leader of the Liberal Democrats political party.

History 
The museum was established in August 1966 by the late William ("Willie") P. Dale.

References

External links 
 

Museums in East Lothian
Automobile museums in Scotland